"We Were Young" is a song by French DJ and music producer Petit Biscuit, featuring vocals from English singer-songwriter JP Cooper. It was released as a single on 29 May 2019 by Petit Biscuit Music.

Background
In an interview with Billboard, Petit Biscuit said, "'We Were Young' is like a hymn to an innocent love, a beautiful love ... even a bit too beautiful to be true. We Were Young really is a big blend of my pop and electronic influences, even going to gospel on the choruses. Working together with JP on the different vocal parts of the track was a real pleasure. His particular tone brought a lot of freshness to my electronic production." JP Cooper said, "I was so excited to get in the studio with Mehdi. I'd heard some of his work and his sound I absolutely loved. Genuinely, I think this kid is a bit of a genius when it comes to electronic music. I wanted to make sure that I brought a little bit of my flavor to the track, and I think it fused beautifully. It was really interesting to try and write a classic-sounding chorus over such a modern-sounding track, and I'm super happy with how it turned out."

Music video
A music video to accompany the release of "We Were Young" was first released onto YouTube on 3 July 2019.

Track listing

Charts

Release history

References

2019 songs
2019 singles
Petit Biscuit songs
JP Cooper songs
Song recordings produced by Petit Biscuit
Songs written by JP Cooper
Songs written by Petit Biscuit